Christen Lindencrone (24 December 1703 - 17 August 1772) was a Danish landowner and supercargo of the Danish Asia Company. He owned Gjorslev Manor on Stevns and constructed the Lindencrone Mansion  (Lindencrones Palæ) on Bredgade in Copenhagen. He was ennobled in 1757 with the surname Lindencrone.

Biography
He was born  Christian Jensen Lintrup on 24 December 1703 in the village of Løgstør in Vesthimmerland, Denmark. 
His parents were Jens Christensen Lendrup (ca. 1668-1716) and Anne Povelsdatter.

He participated as a 2nd assistant on the ship Cron Printz Christian on Danish Asiatic Company's first voyage to China in 1730. By 1738 he had been promoted to 1st supercargo with responsibility of loading and purchase of goods. He had become a wealthy man by the time he completed his fifth voyage to China in 1740-42.

Honours
He was appointed to Counselor (Kammerråd) in 1743, appointed to the Justice Council (Justitsråd) in 1750 and granted the title Etatsråd in 1766. He was ennobled in 1756 with the surname Lindencrone. His estate was turned into a title estate (stamhus), meaning that it could not be sold or divided between heirs.

Property
After completing his last voyage to China in 1742, he purchased the three estates Gjorslev, Søholm and Erikstrup. He refurbished the neglected buildings on the estates which had been part of Tryggevælde cavalry district. He was known for treating the peasants on his estates well, introducing agricultural reforms and buildings schools for their children.

He constructed a town mansion in Copenhagen's new Frederiksstaden neighbourhood in 1751. It was built at the corner of Bredgade and Sankt Annæ Plads to design by the leading architect Nicolai Eigtved and with the use of limestone from his estates on Stevns.

Personal life
He married Mette Holmsted (1722-1793) on 7 November 1742 in the Church of Holmen in Copenhagen. She was a daughter of the mayor of Copenhagen Frederik Holmsted (1683-1758) and his wife Anna Martha Holmsted née Brinck (c. 1696-1758).

References

External links
 Christian Lindencrone
 Christian Lindencrone
 Source (furniture)

18th-century Danish landowners
18th-century Danish businesspeople
 Danish Asiatic Company people
Danish businesspeople in shipping
Danish merchants
People from Vesthimmerland Municipality
People from Stevns Municipality
Businesspeople from Copenhagen
1703 births
1772 deaths